Elmalı is a village in the İznik district of Bursa Province in Turkey.

References

Villages in İznik District